Kazee is a surname. Notable people with the surname include: 

Buell Kazee (1900–1976), American country and folk singer
Damontae Kazee (born 1993), American football player
Jeff Kazee, American musician and songwriter
Steve Kazee (born 1975), American actor and singer